List of presidents of the Senate of Lesotho.

This is a list of presidents of the Senate of Lesotho.

Footnote and references

Politics of Lesotho
Lesotho politics-related lists
Lesotho, Senate

Lesotho
1965 establishments in Basutoland